Clive Orminston Abdulah (born 5 June 1927) is a retired Bishop of Trinidad who continues to serve the Church as an assistant bishop and a member of the Anglican Consultative Council.

Biography
Born in Woodbrook, Port of Spain, Trinidad, Abdulah attended Rosary Boys' School and Queen's Royal College, before continuing his education at the Universities of Pennsylvania (BA, 1950) and the University of Toronto.

He was ordained in 1954 and began his ecclesiastical career with a curacy in Kingston, Jamaica. He was then Rector of Highgate and Rural Dean of St Mary's in the same country before his elevation to the episcopate. He was the first black bishop of the Anglican church in Trinidad and Tobago and was the first West Indian bishop to serve on the board of directors of the Anglican Centre in Rome, Italy (from 1992 to 1995).

A noted Freemason, Abdulah has spoken out about political deadlock in Trinidad.

Awards
Abdulah's awards include the Hummingbird Medal (Gold) and an honorary degree of Doctor of Letters (DLitt) from the University of the West Indies.

References

1927 births
Living people
Recipients of the Hummingbird Medal
Anglican bishops of Trinidad and Tobago
University of Pennsylvania alumni
University of Toronto alumni
Alumni of Queen's Royal College, Trinidad
People from Port of Spain